Harry Wall (1878–1942) was an American college football coach and physician. He was the 15th head football coach at the University of Richmond in Richmond, Virginia serving for one season, in 1904, and compiling a record of 1–5. A native of Winchester, Virginia, Wall graduated from the University of Virginia School of Medicine and played football at Virginia as a halfback, lettering in 1903.

Wall later practiced medicine in Norfolk, Virginia and was a member of the surgical staff at St. Vincent's Hospital there. In 1920, he was commissioned as a captain in the Medical Corps of the United States Army.

Head coaching record

References

External links
 

1878 births
1942 deaths
20th-century American physicians
American football halfbacks
Richmond Spiders football coaches
Virginia Cavaliers football coaches
Virginia Cavaliers football players
United States Army officers
University of Virginia School of Medicine alumni
West Virginia University alumni
People from Winchester, Virginia
Coaches of American football from Virginia
Players of American football from Virginia
Physicians from Virginia